Coolkeeragh power station is a power station near Derry in Northern Ireland.

The station produces 400 megawatts from a gas-fired combined cycle power plant, constructed on the site of the old Coolkeeragh power station. Ownership of the plant was shared between Coolkeeragh Power Ltd and ESB International (ESBI) but it is now solely owned by ESB International (ESBI), a subsidiary of ESB.

Gas is supplied to the station by a pipeline that also serves many towns in Northern Ireland.

History

Coolkeeragh Power Limited (CPL) had been generating electricity since 1959 and ceased operations at the end of March 2005. The old oil-fired station was viewed as the least attractive power plant to sell off in Northern Ireland, because of its limited lifespan.

New gas-fired power station
Construction of the new ESB owned 400 MW CCGT power station commenced in 2002 by the EPC consortium group of GE and VA Tech Hydro of Austria. The station entered commercial operation in June 2005. The station consists of a 260 MW General Electric 9FA+e  gas turbine, a 140 MW Alstom steam turbine and Standard Fasel heat recovery steam generator (HRSG). Actual power output depends on atmospheric conditions, such as temperature and humidity. The gas turbine runs primarily on natural gas but can also operate on ultra low sulphur diesel in case of disruption of the gas supply.

The electricity which is generated at 15.75 kV is increased to a higher 275 kV and 110 kV level by step-up transformers to match the Northern Ireland Electricity (NIE) transmission system requirements. This high-voltage electricity is transferred by underground cables to existing outgoing feeder connections in an adjacent NIE switchyard and then through the transmission system to the electricity users.

Demolition of the old oil-fired power station was completed in 2010.

See also

Electricity sector in Ireland

References

External links
Coolkeeragh ESB website

Natural gas-fired power stations in Northern Ireland
Buildings and structures in County Londonderry
Derry (city)